Ungu ( 'Purple') is an Indonesian rock band formed in Jakarta in 1996 with Makki as the only remaining original member. The group comprises vocalist Pasha, guitarists Enda & Onci, bassist Makki, and drummer Rowman.

Ungu are known for their hit singles, such as "Demi Waktu", "Tercipta Untukku", "Andai Ku Tahu" and "Kekasih Gelapku".

Ungu gained mainstream popularity in Malaysia around 2006 with the release of their single "Demi Waktu". followed by their third album Melayang (2006).

In February 2016, Pasha was elected as Deputy Mayor of Palu, Central Sulawesi. However, Pasha is still a member of the band. The vocalist position will be filled by both Enda and Onci for a while during Pasha served as Deputy Mayor.

History

Formation and early years (1996–1999)
The original band members were guitarist Ekky, bassist Makki, drummer Pasha Akbar Firmasnyah and vocalist Ariyo Wahab. In 1997 Ariyo Wahab left the band to be replaced by Michael Pattiradjawane, and in 1998 Pasha Akbar also left the band to be replaced by Richard Jerome. In 1999 Pasha and Getz joined forces. Pasha entered to replace Michael, then in 2001 Enda and Rowman joined, Rowman replaced Richard.

Laguku (2000–2002)
In 2000, Ungu focused efforts on their debut album. Ungu has also released "Hasrat" and "Bunga" for a compilation album, Klik.

Ungu released their first full-length album, Laguku on July 6, 2002. Their first single "Bayang Semu" was used for a soundtrack in ABG (RCTI). Even though the album was considered success, it reached Platinum Award after two years of its release date.

Tempat Terindah (2002–2005)
Just before starting the new album, Ekky decided to leave the band in 2003. His position was replaced by Onci who had just left Funky Kopral.

Ungu released its second album Tempat Terindah in December 2003. The album spawned a hit single "Karena Dia Kamu" and "Suara Hati". The album sold 150,000 copies.

Ungu has also collaborated with Chrisye in his 2004 album, Senyawa.

Melayang (2005–2007)
Ungu successfully recorded new materials for their next album in 2005 and released their next album Melayang in December 2005 in Indonesia alone.

This new album had put Ungu into the spotlight with their hit single "Demi Waktu". The single received massive airplay in both Indonesia and Malaysia which causes 4 record labels in Malaysia to own Ungu's copyright to distribute the album in Malaysia. Malaysian's Suria Records who owns Siti Nurhaliza, won the copyright. The album received good reviews from both Malaysian and Indonesian critics. With the successful airplay from another hits likes Seperti Yang Dulu, Tercipta Untukku, Sejauh Mungkin, and Aku Bukan Pilihan Hatimu, this album able to got double platinum certification.

Other albums and activity (2005–present)

Ungu released a mini album, SurgaMu to celebrate Ramadhan in December 2006. 150,000 copies sold in 15 days. The album received an inspiring recognition from Yusuf Kalla but the band didn't receive it as the band's appearance in Presidential Palace, didn't follow the correct procession protocol.

In 2006, Ungu was nominated for Most Favorite Band/Duo in 2006 MTV Indonesia Awards, Best Video Director "Demi Waktu" Abimael Gandy and Video of the Year "Demi Waktu".

In 2012, Ungu released a compilation album, Timeless. The album was only sold at KFC outlets in Indonesia, and has sold 500.000 in two month. The album compiled top hit singles and four new songs, "Apa Sih Maumu", "Kau Anggap Apa", "Sayang" and "Puing Kenangan". Ungu also includes musicians who merged their albums sold in KFC stores like Cinta Laura, Indah Dewi Pertiwi, Noah, Agnes Monica, SM*SH, T.R.I.A.D, Rossa, Slank, Last Child, Ello, Sammy Simorangkir and Armada.

In 2015, Ungu launched an album called Mozaik. Released on March 18, 2015. This album featuring 2 singles is "Terbaik" and "Aku Tahu". This album feels different from their previous albums, because this album has various musical genres in each song. This album is only sold in all KFC outlets in Indonesia. On July 7, 2015, the Mozaik album received a multiplatinum award for selling more than 200 thousand copies.

In 2015, main vocalist Pasha announced that he will become a candidate to being a Vice Major of Palu in the 2015 simultaneous regional head election alongside major candidate Hidayat. They currently have the most votes.

Case

Riots on concerts
During a concert in Mojokerto, East Java, on March 30, 2006, dozens of female fans fainted. Nine months later, on December 19, 2006, the concert "Popcoholic with Purple" at Widya Mandala Krida Stadium, Kedungwuni, Pekalongan ended in riots that resulted in 10 deaths and six others seriously injured because of being trampled and lack of oxygen when tens of thousands crowded out after watching their concert.

Band members

Current members
 Makki Omar Parikesit — bass guitar, occasional backing vocals 
 M. Nur "Rowman" Rohman — drums, occasional backing vocals 
 Sigit Purnomo Syamsuddin "Pasha" Said — lead vocals 
 Franco "Enda" Medjaya — guitar , vocals 
 Arlonsy "Onci" Miraldi — guitar , vocals 

 Additional Members 
 Gatot "Gatz" Kies - keyboards piano, backing vocals
Former members
 Pasha Akbar Firmansyah — drums 
 Ariyo "Riyo" Wahab — guitar 
 Michael Pattiradjawane — vocals 
 Gatot "Gatz" Kies — keyboards 
 Richard "Icad" Jerome — drums 
 Franky "Ekky" Hediakso — guitar

Discography

Studio albums

Extended plays

Awards and nominations

Notes

References

External links 
 Official website 
 
 Ungu discography on iTunes
 Ungu discography on Discogs

1996 establishments in Indonesia
Anugerah Musik Indonesia winners
Indonesian musical groups
Indonesian pop music groups
Indonesian rock music groups
Musical groups established in 1996
Pop rock groups